Marcelo Gabriel Pío (born 13 May 1996) is an Argentine professional footballer who plays as a forward.

Career
Pío began his career with Defensores Unidos. His first appearances for the club arrived in the 2017–18 Primera C Metropolitana as he featured seven times, with the campaign ending with promotion as champions to Primera B Metropolitana. He scored his first senior goal in the subsequent season, netting in a draw away from home against Deportivo Riestra on 3 May 2019. Pío was released in June 2019.

Career statistics
.

Honours
Defensores Unidos
Primera C Metropolitana: 2017–18

References

External links

1996 births
Living people
Place of birth missing (living people)
Argentine footballers
Association football forwards
Primera C Metropolitana players
Primera B Metropolitana players
Defensores Unidos footballers